Ancylosis griseomixtella is a species of snout moth in the genus Ancylosis. It was described by Émile Louis Ragonot in 1887. It is found in China.

The wingspan is 24–30 mm.

References

Moths described in 1887
griseomixtella
Moths of Asia